Gastrodes is a genus of dirt-colored seed bugs in the family Rhyparochromidae. There are about 14 described species in Gastrodes.

Species
These 14 species belong to the genus Gastrodes:

 Gastrodes abietum Bergroth, 1914
 Gastrodes arizonensis Usinger, 1938
 Gastrodes chinensis Zheng, 1981
 Gastrodes conicolus Usinger, 1933
 Gastrodes crassifemur Zheng, 1979
 Gastrodes grossipes DeGeer, 1773
 Gastrodes intermedius Usinger, 1938
 Gastrodes longirostris Puton, 1884
 Gastrodes pacificus (Provancher, 1885–1890)
 Gastrodes parvulus Kerzhner, 1977
 Gastrodes piceus Zheng, 1979
 Gastrodes pilifer Zheng, 1979
 Gastrodes remotus Usinger, 1938
 Gastrodes walleyi Usinger, 1938

References

External links

 

Drymini
Articles created by Qbugbot